The Cathedral of Saint Mary of Bayonne or the Cathedral of Our Lady of Bayonne (French: Cathédrale Sainte-Marie de Bayonne or Cathédrale Notre-Dame de Bayonne; Basque: Santa Maria katedrala or Andre Maria katedrala), commonly known as Bayonne Cathedral, is a Roman Catholic church in the town of Bayonne, France. It is the seat of the former Bishops of Bayonne, now the Bishops of Bayonne, Lescar, and Oloron. The cathedral is in the Gothic architectural tradition.

The site was previously occupied by a Romanesque cathedral that was destroyed by two fires in 1258 and 1310. Construction of the present cathedral began in the 13th century and was completed at the beginning of the 17th, except for the two spires which were not finished until the 19th century. The structure has been much restored and refurbished, notably by Émile Boeswildwald, architect to the French government in the 19th century, and a pupil of Eugène Viollet-le-Duc.

The cathedral contains the relics of Saint Leo of Bayonne, a 9th-century Bishop of Bayonne and evangelizer of the Basque Country. The cathedral stands on the Pilgrimage Way of Santiago de Compostela and, as part of the Routes of Santiago de Compostela in France, has been added to the UNESCO World Heritage List in 1998.

References

Bibliography

Saint-Vanne, A. (1930). "La cathedrale de Bayonne". Bulletin trimestriel: Société des sciences, lettres, arts, et d'ėtudes regionales de Bayonne n.s. 5 (Bayonne 1930), pp. 10–51.

External links

Location of this building
Website of the cloister

Roman Catholic cathedrals in France
Churches in Pyrénées-Atlantiques
World Heritage Sites in France
Bayonne